Tnoy Andrew (born 7 November 1992) is a footballer from the US Virgin Islands who plays as a defender for Swetes FC and the United States Virgin Islands national soccer team.

Career

International career
Andrew made his senior international debut on 22 March 2015 in a 1-0 victory over Barbados during World Cup qualifying.

Career statistics

International

References

External links

1992 births
Living people
United States Virgin Islands soccer players
Association football defenders
United States Virgin Islands international soccer players